IFK Österåker FK is a Swedish football club located in Åkersberga.

Background
IFK Österåker FK currently plays in Division 2 Norra Svealand which is the fourth tier of Swedish football. They play their home matches at the Åkersberga IP in Åkersberga.

The club is affiliated with Stockholms Fotbollförbund.

Season to season

Footnotes

External links
 IFK Österåker FK – Official website
 IFK Österåker FK on Facebook

Football clubs in Stockholm
1928 establishments in Sweden
Idrottsföreningen Kamraterna